Oberon is a legendary king of the fairies.

Oberon may also refer to:

Creative works and characters
 Oberon (Seyler), a 1789 Singspiel by Friederike Sophie Seyler
 Oberon (Weber), an 1826 opera by Carl Maria von Weber
 Oberon (poem), a 1796 epic poem by Christoph Martin Wieland
 Oberon, the Faery Prince, a 16th-century masque by Ben Jonson
 Oberon (comics), a character in DC Comics
 Oberon, a character in The Chronicles of Amber
 Oberon, a Gargoyles character
 Oberon, a fictional spacecraft in Planet of the Apes
 Oberon, a playable character in the game Warframe
 Oberon, a character in the manga The Ancient Magus' Bride
Oberon, a character in the play A Midsummer Night's Dream

Computing
 Oberon (operating system)
 Oberon (programming language)

Naval vessels
 HMS Oberon (1805), a 16-gun brig-sloop
 HMS Oberon (P21), an Odin-class submarine launched in 1926
 HMS Oberon (S09), an Oberon-class submarine launched in 1959
 Oberon-class submarine

Places
 Oberon, New South Wales, a town in Australia
 Oberon Council, a local government area in New South Wales, Australia
 Oberon, North Dakota, US
 Lake Oberon in the Arthur Range, Tasmania

Other uses
 Oberon (moon), a moon of Uranus
 Oberon Books, a publisher based in London
 Oberon High School, a secondary school in Victoria, Australia
 Oberon Mall, a shopping mall in India
 Oberon Media, a multi-platform casual games company
 Club Oberon, club theater venue built by the Carr Foundation
 Oberon, a beer manufactured by Bell's Brewery

People with the name
 Marc Oberon, English magician
 Merle Oberon (1911–1979), British actress
 Oberon Zell-Ravenheart (born 1942), Neopagan activist

See also
 Auberon (disambiguation)
 HMS Oberon, a list of ships